William Marcus "Mark" West was a Scottish American pioneer who settled in what is now eastern Sonoma County, California, United States.

Life
West came to the area in 1832, soon after marrying Guadalupe Vasquez, a sister of General Vallejo. At the time, the area belonged to Mexico. In 1840, he acquired the  Rancho San Miguel, located north of Santa Rosa Creek. Mark West established a hacienda, post office, and trading post near Mark West Creek.

Maria Francisca Guadalupe Vasquez y Lugo, who was the daughter of Felipe Vasquez  y and Nicanor Lugo, married Mark West at the Mission San Carlos Boromeo in 1834. She was the granddaughter of Juan Athanasio Vasquez, who was a soldier in the Anza 1776 Expedition. Her father, Jose Felipe Vasquez y Bojorquez, was grantee of Rancho Chamiscal in 1835

Legacy
Several geographic features in the area were named after him, including Mark West Creek, Mark West School, and the communities of Mark West and Mark West Springs, California.

See also
Santa Rosa, California

References

History of Sonoma County, California
Naturalized citizens of Mexican California